The globe effect, sometimes called the rolling ball effect or the spinning globe effect, is an optical phenomenon—perhaps partially an optical illusion—that occurs with visual optical instruments, in particular binoculars and telescopes, that are designed to be free of distortion. When these instruments are panned, the moving image appears to roll over a curved, convex surface. In 1949, Horst Koehler at Zeiss (Jena) suggested adding some pincushion distortion to the optical design to eliminate the globe effect. August Sonnefeld conducted experiments with volunteers, which supported the claim that a supplementary distortion could improve the imaging of visual optical instruments. Since that time, most binocular manufacturers have followed Zeiss's example and added pincushion distortion to their optical design.

The origin of the globe effect initially remained unclear after its discovery in the first half of the past century. Koehler speculated about an "unnatural perspective generated by the binocular while panning over a three dimensional scenery", thereby ignoring the fact that the globe effect was observable at the night sky as well, where perspective distortions were absent.

Recently, the globe effect has been linked to the peculiar properties of human visual perception, which adds a certain amount of barrel distortion to the visual field. The amount of barrel distortion is subject to individual differences, which explains the fact that the perceived intensity of the globe effect varies significantly between different observers.

An alternative approach for explaining the globe effect comes from the technical journalist  and optics specialist Walter E. Schön. He states that the observed effect is in fact not that of a rolling globe but that of a vertically rotating cylinder. The globe shape of the illusion seen by most observers is only because the field of view through the optical device is circular. This illusion of a rotating cylinder during panning is caused by the horizontal movement of the image being (due to the angular magnification of the device) faster and more uniform (with less parallax) compared to the naked eye and also not corresponding to the felt rotational speed of the observer's head. When the brain tries to integrate these conflicting signals, it creates the perception that the image is moving slower at the left and right edges than in the middle, giving the illusion of a rotating cylinder.

References

Bibliography

External links
Distortion and globe effect in binoculars

See also
 geometrical optics

Optical phenomena